The 2007 Albert Park state by-election was a by-election held on 15 September 2007 for the Victorian Legislative Assembly seat of Albert Park, immediately to the south of Melbourne's central business district.

The by-election was triggered by the resignation of Labor member and Deputy Premier John Thwaites. Former state secretary of the Australian Services Union Martin Foley held the seat for Labor at the election.

Results

Notes

Victorian state by-elections
2007 elections in Australia
2000s in Victoria (Australia)